David Francis Barry  (March 6, 1854 – March 6, 1934) was a 19th-century photographer of the American West.

Early life
Barry was born in Honeoye Falls, New York. In 1861, his family moved west to Otsego, Wisconsin and the following year to nearby Columbus. While growing up in Columbus, Wisconsin David F. Barry landed odd jobs assisting an itinerant photographer named Orlando Scott Goff who had maintained a small gallery in that city.

Career
In 1871, Orlando Scott Goff moved to Yankton, Dakota Territory opening up the first photographer's studio in that settlement and two years later relocated to Bismarck.  Goff sent for Barry to join him in 1878, his former young helper, taking him under his wings as an apprentice to assist him at his new Bismarck gallery. Over time their friendship grew to prompt Goff to make Barry his business partner. Between 1878 and 1883, utilizing a portable photographic studio, Barry traveled throughout the Plains, to Fort Buford and Fort Yates in the Dakotas and Fort Assiniboine in Montana taking photographs as he went. Having taken over Goff's business interests he eventually set up his own studio at Fort Yates and later in Bismarck. Barry made his name photographing Lakota people notables such as Sitting Bull, Rain-in-the-Face, Gall (Phizi), John Grass and others. The Lakota people nicknamed him "Little Shadow Catcher." Barry returned in 1890 to Wisconsin, where he operated a successful gallery in the city of Superior until his death in 1934.

Personal life
Barry was married in Chicago on March 27, 1884, to Margaret "Patty" Young of Quincy, Illinois. The marriage remained childless. She died on August 20, 1932. The following year, in 1933 Barry sustained a serious leg injury while stepping off a street car in Duluth, Minnesota from which he never entirely recovered. He died on his 80th birthday at his Superior, Wisconsin home on March 6, 1934.

Gallery

References

1854 births
1934 deaths
Photographers from New York (state)
People from Mendon, New York
People from Columbus, Wisconsin